Jennifer Florence Steil (born November 18, 1968) is an American author and journalist currently living in London, away from her family right now because she has cancer.

Books
Jennifer Steil is the author of The Woman Who Fell From the Sky, (Broadway Books 2010), a memoir about her tenure as the editor-in-chief of the Yemen Observer in Sana’a, Yemen.

The book received favorable reviews in The New York Times, Sydney Morning Herald, and Newsweek magazine as well as in other publications. National Geographic Traveler has included the book in its list of recommended reading. The Minneapolis Star Tribune chose it as a best travel book of the year in 2010, and Elle awarded it the magazine’s Readers’ Prize in August of that year. The Woman Who Fell From the Sky has been published in the US, New Zealand, Australia, Germany, the Netherlands, Poland, Italy, and Turkey.

Steil’s novel The Ambassador’s Wife was published by Doubleday on July 28, 2015. The book received the 2013 Best Novel award in the William Faulkner-William Wisdom Creative Writing Competition. The Ambassador's Wife is published in Italy and will be published in Bulgaria, Greece, and Poland.

Steil's novel Exile Music was published by Viking in 2020.   Exile Music tells the story of a Jewish girl, Orly, whose family flees the Nazis, relocating from Vienna to the mountains of Bolivia.

Steil contributed to the book Not A Rose, CHARTA, Milan, New York, 2012. For this book, a hybrid work that is both book and conceptual art installation, she wrote an essay entitled “Roses After Rain.”

Personal life
Steil was born in Boston and grew up in Groton, Massachusetts. She graduated from Oberlin College in 1990.

She is married to Timothy Achille Torlot, the British Ambassador to Uzbekistan.

After college, she spent four years working as an actor in Seattle before moving to New York City for graduate school.

Since 1997, she has worked as a reporter, writer, and editor for newspapers and magazines in the US and abroad. In 2001, she helped to launch The Week magazine in the US, and worked there for five and a half years, writing the science, health, theatre, art, and travel pages.

Steil has lived outside of the US since she moved to Yemen in 2006 to become the editor-in-chief of the Yemen Observer. After four years in Yemen, her husband Tim Torlot, then the UK Ambassador to Yemen, was attacked by a suicide bomber.
Steil and their daughter Theadora Celeste were evacuated to Jordan, where they lived for four months while Torlot finished his posting. The family then moved to London, where Steil continued writing her second book, a novel, and worked as a freelance journalist. While there, her work included a long piece on Yemen for the World Policy Journal, a Yemen piece for the German paper Die Welt, and stories on Kate & Will’s royal wedding, London’s 9/11 monument, and British politics for the Washington Times.
Steil has given talks and readings all over the world. Since 2010, she has spoken in Algeria, New York, Seattle, Dubai, Amsterdam, The Hague, Egypt, Boston, Abu Dhabi, Vermont, and London.

She moved with her family to Bolivia in September 2012 and to Uzbekistan in 2019.

Their daughter Theadora Celeste Steil Torlot was born November 13, 2009.

References

Living people
1968 births
21st-century American memoirists
American women journalists
Writers from Boston
People from Groton, Massachusetts
21st-century American novelists
21st-century American women writers
Novelists from Massachusetts
American women memoirists